Amicus Poloniae is a distinction, established in 1996 by the Polish ambassador to the United States and conferred annually to the citizens of the United States for  merits in the field of Polish-American relations, especially in the popularization of achievements of Polish culture, sciences and the promotion of Poland in the United States.

Together with the distinction the laureate receives a plaque made from cherry wood and adorned with a brass White Eagle – the Coat of arms of Poland - and an engraved plate with the name of the laureate.

Laureates 
1996 Stefan & Wanda Wilk – Los Angeles, California, Polish Music Center, University of Southern California
1997 Ellen K. Lee – La Senda, California, Helena Modrzejewska Foundation, California
1998 Paulina Babinski – Denver, Colorado, American Council of Polish Culture in Denver
1999 Joshua Siegel – New York, NY, Department of Film and Video Museum of Modern Art., New York
2000 Paul Mazursky – Beverly Hills, California, Actor, film director; Kevin Mulroy, Los Angeles, California, Research Director, Autry Museum 
2001 Hanna Saxon – Miami, Florida, Chopin Foundation in the USA
2002 George E. Pataki – governor of New York State
2003 Richard Farwell – Executive Director of Vizcaya Museum and Gardens
2004 Frank Barnyak – President of the U. S. Navy League in Los Angeles
2005 Anna M. Cienciala – Professor of History and Russian and Eastern European Studies, University of Kansas
2006 Salme Harju Steinberg – President of Northeastern Illinois University
2007 David Lynch – cinema director
2007 Clay Bullwinkel - Silicon Valley businessman and mentor of Poland-based technology companies
2008 Yola Czaderska-Hayek, Mahendra Patel – Chief Executive Officer, Hope Medical Institute
2009 Jane Kaczmarek – actress graduated from the University of Wisconsin and the Yale School of Drama.
2010 Wojciech Kielak – Former president of the Polish American Congress in Nebraska and a commanding officer in Gen. Maczek's Division in the Western European Front
2012 Paula Freer – Director of International Government Relations for Marathon Oil Corporation
2013 Teresa Lowenthal, Paul Lowenthal – American Institute of Polish Culture, Miami, Florida
2014 Bruce Rauner – governor of Illinois
2015 Georgetown University Press
2017 Zbigniew Kantorosinski – Chief of the Germanic and Slavic Division, Library of Congress

References

External links 
Embassy of Poland

Polish awards
Poland–United States relations